Avilovo is a rural locality (a selo) in Kuptsovskoye Rural Settlement, Kotovsky District, Volgograd Oblast, Russia. The population was 131 as of 2010. There are 3 streets.

Geography 
Avilovo is located in forest steppe, on Volga Upland, on the right bank of the Mokraya Olkhovka River, 32 km southeast of Kotovo (the district's administrative centre) by road. Novonikolayevka is the nearest rural locality.

References 

Rural localities in Kotovsky District